The Jade Peak Pagoda is a Chinese pagoda on Jade Spring Hill in an Imperial Garden, Jingming Yuan , in Beijing, China. The site was originally an imperial retreat during the Liao Dynasty (907–1125) and was renovated by the Qianlong Emperor (r. 1735–1796) in 1752.

Its design imitates the Cishou Pagoda of Jiangtian Temple on the Golden Hill, near Zhenjiang, Jiangsu. It was designed to appear similar to wooden structures. All eight sides on every level feature doors and windows. The walls are thick, and the interior features a wide spiral stone staircase. Niches in the walls of each storey include carved couplets by the Qianlong Emperor and once held a set of bronze Buddhas.

See also
Duobao Glazed Pagoda, another renowned pagoda in the Summer Palace

Notes

References
Aldrich, M.A. (2006). The Search for a Vanishing Beijing: A Guide to China's Capital Through the Ages. Hong Kong: Hong Kong University Press. .

Pagodas in China
Buddhist temples in Beijing
Summer Palace (Beijing)
Buildings and structures in Beijing
Octagonal buildings in China